Glyceria notata, the plicate sweet-grass or marked glyceria, is an invasive specie part of the  rhizomatous family. tufted, perennial grasses in the mannagrass genus, found in all continents of the world. Its culms are 30–80 cm in height, ascending from a prostrate base, with dark- to bluish-green, flat or folded leaf-blades some 5–30 cm long by 3–14 mm wide.

References

External links
 GrassBase entry
 
 eFloras entry (Glyceria plicata)

notata
Grasses of Africa
Grasses of Asia
Grasses of Europe